Terphenyls are a group of closely related aromatic hydrocarbons.  Also known as diphenylbenzenes or triphenyls, they consist of a central benzene ring substituted with two phenyl groups.  There are three substitution patterns: ortho-terphenyl, meta-terphenyl, and para-terphenyl.  Commercial grade terphenyl is generally a mixture of the three isomers.   This mixture is used in the production of polychlorinated terphenyls, which were formerly used as heat storage and transfer agents.

p-Terphenyl is the most common isomer.  It is used as a laser dye and a sunscreen ingredient.

See also
 Biphenyl
 Terpyridine
 Terthiophene

References

External links
 p-Terphenyl at the Oregon Laser Medical Center
 o-Terphenyl, m-Terphenyl, p-Terphenyl at Centers for Disease Control and Prevention, National Institute for Occupational Safety and Health

Aromatic hydrocarbons
Phenyl compounds